This article provides a collection of statewide public opinion polls that were conducted relating to the 2012 United States presidential election, which was won by incumbent President Barack Obama. The polls show the status between Republican nominee Mitt Romney and President Obama. Also included are three- and four-way race polls with the Republican and Democratic nominees against various third party candidates.

Opinion polling: Obama vs Romney

Sample size key:

LV – Likely Voters 
RV – Registered Voters.

Poll source key

(R) – Source polls normally for Republicans
(D) – Source polls normally for Democrats

Alabama
9 electoral votes(Republican in 2004) 62%–38% (Republican in 2008) 60%–38%

Alaska
3 electoral votes(Republican in 2004) 61%–35% (Republican in 2008) 59%–37%

No polls conducted

Arizona
11 electoral votes (Republican in 2004) 55%–44% (Republican in 2008) 53%–45%

Arkansas
6 electoral votes (Republican in 2004) 54%–45% (Republican in 2008) 59%–39%

California
55 electoral votes(Democratic in 2004) 54%–45% (Democratic in 2008) 61%–37%

Colorado
9 electoral votes (Republican in 2004) 52%–47% (Democratic in 2008) 54%–45%

Three way race

Connecticut
7 electoral votes (Democratic in 2004) 54%–44% (Democratic in 2008) 61%–38%

Delaware
3 electoral votes(Democratic in 2004) 53%–46% (Democratic in 2008) 62%–37%

No polls conducted

District of Columbia
3 electoral votes (Democratic in 2004) 89%–9% (Democratic in 2008) 92%–7%

Florida
29 electoral votes (Republican in 2004) 52%–47% (Democratic in 2008) 51%–48%

Three-way race

Georgia
16 electoral votes(Republican in 2004) 58%–41% (Republican in 2008) 52%–47%

Hawaii
4 electoral votes (Democratic in 2004) 54%–45% (Democratic in 2008) 72%–27%

Idaho
4 electoral votes (Republican in 2004) 68%–30% (Republican in 2008) 61%–36%

Illinois
20 electoral votes (Democratic in 2004) 55%–45% (Democratic in 2008) 62%–37%

Indiana
11 electoral votes (Republican in 2004) 60%–39% (Democratic in 2008) 50%–49%

Iowa
6 electoral votes (Republican in 2004) 50%–49% (Democratic in 2008) 54%–44%

Kansas
6 electoral votes  (Republican in 2004) 62%–37% (Republican in 2008) 57%–42%

Kentucky
8 electoral votes  (Republican in 2004) 60%–40% (Republican in 2008) 57%–41%

Louisiana
8 electoral votes  (Republican in 2004) 57%–42% (Republican in 2008) 59%–40%

Maine
4 electoral votes  (Democratic in 2004) 53%–45% (Democratic in 2008) 58%–40%

Maryland
10 electoral votes  (Democratic in 2004) 56%–43% (Democratic in 2008) 61%–38%

Massachusetts
11 electoral votes  (Democratic in 2004) 62%–37% (Democratic in 2008) 62%–36%

Michigan
16 electoral votes  (Democratic in 2004) 51%–48% (Democratic in 2008) 57%–41%

Minnesota
10 electoral votes (Democratic in 2004) 51%–48% (Democratic in 2008) 54%–44%

Mississippi
6 electoral votes  (Republican in 2004) 59%–40% (Republican in 2008) 56%–43%

Missouri
10 electoral votes  (Republican in 2004) 53%–46% (Republican in 2008) 49%–49%

Montana
3 electoral votes  (Republican in 2004) 59%–39% (Republican in 2008) 49%–47%

Three way race

Nebraska
5 electoral votes(Republican in 2004) 66%–33% (Republican in 2008) 57%–42%

2nd Congressional District

Nevada
6 electoral votes  (Republican in 2004) 51%–48% (Democratic in 2008) 55%–43%

Three way race

New Hampshire
4 electoral votes  (Democratic in 2004) 50%–49% (Democratic in 2008) 54%–45%

New Jersey
14 electoral votes  (Democratic in 2004) 52%–46% (Democratic in 2008) 57%–42%

New Mexico
5 electoral votes  (Republican in 2004) 50%–49% (Democratic in 2008) 57%–42%

Three way race

New York
29 electoral votes  (Democratic in 2004) 58%–40% (Democratic in 2008) 63%–36%

North Carolina
15 electoral votes (Republican in 2004) 56%–44% (Democratic in 2008) 50%–49%

North Dakota
3 electoral votes (Republican in 2004) 63%–36% (Republican in 2008) 53%–45%

Ohio
18 electoral votes  (Republican in 2004) 51%–49% (Democratic in 2008) 52%–47%

Three way race

Oklahoma
7 electoral votes  (Republican in 2004) 66%–34%  (Republican in 2008) 67%–34%

Oregon
7 electoral votes  (Democratic in 2004) 51%–47%  (Democratic in 2008) 57%–40%

Pennsylvania
20 electoral votes (Democratic in 2004) 51%–48% (Democratic in 2008) 54%–44%

Three-way race

Four-way race

Rhode Island
4 electoral votes  (Democratic in 2004) 59%–39% (Democratic in 2008) 63%–35%

South Carolina
9 electoral votes (Republican in 2004) 58%–41% (Republican in 2008) 54%–45%

South Dakota
3 electoral votes (Republican in 2004) 60%–38% (Republican in 2008) 53%–45%

Tennessee
11 electoral votes (Republican in 2004) 57%–43% (Republican in 2008) 57%–42%

Texas
38 electoral votes  (Republican in 2004) 61%–38% (Republican in 2008) 55%–44%

Utah
6 electoral votes  (Republican in 2004) 72%–26%   (Republican in 2008) 62%–34%

Vermont
3 electoral votes  (Democratic in 2004) 59%–39% (Democratic in 2008) 67%–30%

Virginia
13 electoral votes  (Republican in 2004) 54%–46%   (Democratic in 2008) 53%–46%

Three-way race

Four-way race

Five-way race

Washington
12 electoral votes  (Democratic in 2004) 53%–46%  (Democratic in 2008) 58%–40%

West Virginia
5 electoral votes  (Republican in 2004) 56%–43%   (Republican in 2008) 56%–43%

Wisconsin
10 electoral votes  (Democratic in 2004) 50%–49%   (Democratic in 2008) 56%–42%

Three way race

Wyoming
3 electoral votes  (Republican in 2004) 69%–29%   (Republican in 2008) 65%–33%

No polls conducted

See also
Nationwide opinion polling for the United States presidential election, 2012
Nationwide opinion polling for the Republican Party 2012 presidential primaries
Statewide opinion polling for the Republican Party presidential primaries, 2012
Statewide opinion polling for the United States presidential election, 2008
Republican Party presidential primaries, 2012

External links
 American Research Group
 FiveThirtyEight at The New York Times
 Huffingtonpost
 Polling Report
 Princeton Election Consortium
 Public Policy Polling
 Rasmussen Reports
 Real Clear Politics
 Votamatic

Opinion polling for the 2012 United States presidential election